Marcel Glesener (born 17 April 1937 in Esch-sur-Alzette) is a Luxembourgish politician and trade unionist.  He is a member of the Christian Social People's Party (CSV), sitting in the national legislature, the Chamber of Deputies.

Glesener has been a member of the CSV since 1957.  He was President of the CSV-leaning Luxembourg Confederation of Christian Trade Unions (LCGB) between 1980 and 1996, succeeding Jean Spautz.  Glesener was elected to the Chamber of Deputies in the 1989 elections, representing the Sud constituency.  He has sat in the Chamber ever since, having been re-elected in 1994, 1999, and 2004.

He has been a regular representative of the Chamber of Deputies in international organisations.  Glesener has been a member of the Parliamentary Assembly of the Council of Europe and a member of, and leader of the Luxembourgian delegation to, the Assembly of the Western European Union (WEU) since 1999.  The latter includes spells as Vice-President (2000 – 03) and President (2003 – 04).

Footnotes

External links
  Chamber of Deputies official profile

|-

Members of the Chamber of Deputies (Luxembourg)
Members of the Chamber of Deputies (Luxembourg) from Sud
Christian Social People's Party politicians
Luxembourgian trade unionists
1937 births
Living people
People from Esch-sur-Alzette